Amansie Central District is one of the forty-three districts in Ashanti Region, Ghana. Originally it was formerly part of the then-larger Amansie East District in 1988, until the western part of the district was split off by a decree of president John Agyekum Kufuor on 12 November 2003 (effectively 18 February 2004) to create Amansie Central District; thus the remaining part has been retained as Amansie East District (now currently known as Bekwai Municipal District). The district assembly is located in the southern part of Ashanti Region and has Jacobu as its capital town.

References

Sources
 
 19 New Districts Created, GhanaWeb, November 20, 2003.

2003 establishments in Ghana

Districts of Ashanti Region